Artworks at Hampton Court Palace belong to the Royal Collection and are subject to change. They are displayed in several parts of the palace, including the new Cumberland Art Gallery. In September 2015, the Royal Collection recorded 542 works (only those with images) as being located at Hampton Court, mostly paintings and furniture, but also ceramics and sculpture. The full current list can be obtained from their website.  They include:

 Triumphs of Caesar (Mantegna), 1484–92, displayed in their own section of the palace.
 Anonymous – Field of Cloth of Gold c. 1545.
 Jacopo Bassano – The Adoration of the Shepherds c. 1544–45.
 Sir Godfrey Kneller – William III on Horseback, 1701; Hampton Court Beauties, 1690s.
 Sir Peter Lely – Windsor Beauties, 1660s.
 William Scrots – Edward VI, c. 1550
 Girolamo da Treviso – The Four Evangelists Stoning the Pope early 16th century.
 The Allegory of the Tudor Succession, copy by Remigius van Leemput of Holbein's lost work.
 The Family of Henry VIII.
 Boy Peeling Fruit (Caravaggio)
 The Calling of Saints Peter and Andrew, by Caravaggio
 Rembrandt Self-portrait
 Self-Portrait as the Allegory of Painting by Artemisia Gentileschi
 12 views of Venice by Canaletto
 Portraits by Holbein and Van Dyck

Apart from the paintings some important tapestries are displayed, including:

 The Story of Abraham – Flemish, set of 10 tapestries commissioned by Henry VIII in the early 1540s, 6 of which are displayed in the Great Hall.
 Conflict of Virtues and Vice – Flemish, c1500, probably bought by Cardinal Wolsey in 1522.
 The Story of Alexander the Great – Brussels, late 17th century, in the Queen's Gallery.
 The Labours of Hercules & The Triumph of Bacchus – Brussels, purchased by Henry VIII in the 1540s, in the King's Presence Chamber.

Moved away by 2015
 Agnolo Bronzino (attributed) – Portrait of a Lady in Green c. 1530–32.?
 Pieter Bruegel the Elder – The Massacre of the Innocents 1565–7.
 Marcus Gheeraerts the Younger – Portrait of a Woman c. 1590–1600.
 Lorenzo Lotto – Portrait of Andrea Odoni c. 1525.
 Daniel Mytens – Charles I & Henrietta Maria c. 1630–32.
 Raphael – Self portrait c. 1506–7.

References

Hampton Court Palace
Hampton Court
London-related lists
Hampton Court